The Pliensbachian is an age of the geologic timescale and stage in the stratigraphic column. It is part of the Early or Lower Jurassic Epoch or Series and spans the time between 190.8 ± 1.5 Ma and 182.7 ± 1.5 Ma (million years ago). The Pliensbachian is preceded by the Sinemurian and followed by the Toarcian.

The Pliensbachian ended with the extinction event called the Toarcian turnover. During the Pliensbachian, the middle part of the Lias was deposited in Europe. The Pliensbachian is roughly coeval with the Charmouthian regional stage of North America.

Stratigraphic definitions
The Pliensbachian takes its name from the hamlet of Pliensbach in the community of Zell unter Aichelberg in the Swabian Alb, some 30 km east of Stuttgart in Germany. The name was introduced into scientific literature by German palaeontologist Albert Oppel in 1858.

The base of the Pliensbachian is at the first appearances of the ammonite species Bifericeras donovani and genera Apoderoceras and Gleviceras. The Wine Haven profile near Robin Hood's Bay (Yorkshire, England) has been appointed as global reference profile for the base (GSSP).

The top of the Pliensbachian (the base of the Toarcian Stage) is at the first appearance of ammonite genus Eodactylites.

Biostratigraphy

The Pliensbachian contains five ammonite biozones in the boreal domain:
zone of Pleuroceras spinatum
zone of Amaltheus margaritatus
zone of Prodactylioceras davoei
zone of Tragophylloceras ibex
zone of Uptonia jamesoni

In the Tethys domain, the Pliensbachian contains six biozones:
zone of Emaciaticeras emaciatum
zone of Arieticeras algovianum
zone of Fuciniceras lavinianum
zone of Prodactylioceras davoei
zone of Tragophylloceras ibex
zone of Uptonia jamesoni

References

Notes

Literature
; 2004: A Geologic Time Scale 2004, Cambridge University Press.
; 2002: The Lower Lias of Robin Hood's Bay, Yorkshire, and the work of Leslie Bairstow, Bulletin of the Natural History Museum. Geology Series 58, p. 81–152, Cambridge University Press, The Natural History Museum, (abstract)
; 2006: The Global Boundary Stratotype Section and Point (GSSP) for the base of the Pliensbachian Stage (Lower Jurassic), Wine Haven, Yorkshire, UK, Episodes 29(2), pp. 93–106.
; 1856-1858: Die Juraformation Englands, Frankreichs und des südwestlichen Deutschlands: nach ihren einzelnen Gliedern engetheilt und verglichen, 857 pp., Ebner & Seubert, Stuttgart.

External links
GeoWhen Database - Pliensbachian
Lower Jurassic timescale, at the website of the subcommission for stratigraphic information of the ICS
Stratigraphic chart of the Lower Jurassic, at the website of Norges Network of offshore records of geology and stratigraphy

 
03
Geological ages